Cladardis is a genus of insects belonging to the family Tenthredinidae.

The genus was first described by Benson in 1952.

Species:
 Cladardis hartigi

References

Tenthredinidae
Sawfly genera